Seawings is an experiential seaplane tour operator based in Dubai, United Arab Emirates. The company was established in August 2007 and provides scenic aerial experiences, sightseeing tours and private seaplane charters to destinations in Dubai, Abu Dhabi, Ras Al Khaimah, Fujairah and Muscat, Oman. Its services include scenic flights, customized excursions, golf, day trips, short sightseeing flights, corporate packages and exclusive aircraft charters to over 25 destinations within the UAE and Oman.

Seawings Beyond is a brand of Seawings launched in 2018, offering day and overnight excursions and holidays by private seaplane to fuse scenic flights with luxury experiences to the mountains, beaches and desert island reserves like Sir Bani Yas Island and Zaya Nurai Island.

Operating base and fleet 
Seawings fleet consists of five Cessna 208 Caravan seaplanes, each of which seat 9 guests and a pilot. They take off from multiple operating sites in the United Arab Emirates and Oman including Port Rashid, with other operational locations in Jebel Ali, Dubai Creek, Yas Marina and Marjan Island.

The Seawings seaplane services and maintenance are operated and managed by Jet Ops FZE, a Dubai-based company and holder of a UAE air operator's certificate. Jet-Ops FZE is owned by Air Charter International Arabia LTD, a leading aviation management company providing aircraft leasing, aircraft management and charter services. Air Charter International Arabia LTD has been operating from Dubai since 1994.

History of seaplanes in Dubai 

Seaplanes have always celebrated the pinnacle of luxury travel. In the 1930s, the flying boats resembled a gentleman's club in the sky. Passengers would be accommodated in a club type cabin and would always be dressed for the occasion. Rising early each morning they would join their flying boat for each sector of their long journey. Each night would be spent in an exotic location from Europe, to Egypt to Dubai Creek and thence to India and Australia.

Aviation began in Dubai in 1937, when the first Imperial Airways flying boat, operating a weekly service between the UK and Pakistan, landed on the Dubai Creek. From 1940 to 1950, the Horseshoe Route from Durban to Sydney via the Persian Gulf was established. By the end of 1944, British Overseas Airways Corporation (BOAC) was operating 8 flying boats a week. January 1947 saw the last of the ‘C’ class, Short Empire flying boats operating the Horseshoe route through Khartoum, Luxor, Cairo, Kallia (Dead Sea), Habbaniya (Iraq), Basra, Bahrain, Dubai and Jiwani to Karachi.

See also 

 List of seaplane operators
 Tourist attractions in Dubai
 Dubai Tourism

References 

Companies based in Dubai
Seaplane operators
Tourism in Dubai